The Yorkshire and Derbyshire Cricket League (YDCL) is a Saturday League, founded in 1969. The league administers cricket clubs that participate in its League, Cup and Trophy competitions and is in formal association with the cricket boards of Yorkshire and Derbyshire, and the League Cricket Conference.

The league consists of 4 divisions. Division 1 contains a maximum of 10 teams, divisions 2 and 3 hold 8 teams and division 4 contains the remaining teams. Clubs participating in the league are mainly from the Sheffield region of South Yorkshire, and the rest are clubs from North East Derbyshire and the Peak District.

Since the formation of the league in 1969, the YDCL has witnessed Parkhead Cricket Club build an almost unassailable tally of 12 league championship titles (not including the shared championship title with Stainborough Cricket Club in 1971). Parkhead won their first YDCL championship in 1970, one year after the formation of the league, and maintained a high standard throughout the league's history, culminating with their most recent win in the season of 2019. Hundall follow with 8 championship titles to their name.

Past winners

Performance by season from 2006

References

External links
 Official League Website

Club cricket
English domestic cricket competitions
Cricket in Yorkshire
Cricket in South Yorkshire
Cricket competitions in Yorkshire
Cricket in Derbyshire